Sir John Greville (1427, Chipping Camden - 6 August 1480, Milcote) was an English nobleman of the Greville family. His father John Greville (died 1444) served as a Member of Parliament in seven English parliaments. He succeeded to the manors of Hunningham, Tetbury and Manningford Bruce on his mother Joyce Cokesay's death in 1473.

Marriage and issue
He married Joan Scote (b. 1429) in 1449 and with her he had three children:
Sir Thomas Greville alias Cokesey (1452-6 March 1498)
Margaret Greville (b. 1454)

References

Sources
George Edward Cokayne, The Complete Peerage of England, Scotland, Ireland, Great Britain and the United Kingdom, Extant, Extinct, or Dormant (London: St. Catherine Press, 1910.), 6:181a, Los Angeles Public Library, 929.721 C682.
George Ormerod, The History of the County Palatine and City of Chester (London: Lackington, Hughes, Mavor & Jones, 1819.), 2:599, Family History Library, 942.71 H2or.
Joseph Edmondson, An Historical and Genealogical Account of the Noble Family of Greville (London: J. Edmonson, 1766.), pp. 4–5, Family History Library, 929.242 G869e.
Collectanea Topographica et Genealogica (London: J.B. Nichols, 1834–1843. FHL BRITISH Film #496,953 Item 3.), 6:74, Family History Library
Egerton Brydges, Collins's Peerage of England (London: T. Bensley, 1812.), 4:332-3, Family History Library, 942 D22be.
Egerton Brydges, Collins's Peerage, 4:333.
Paul Walton Mackenzie, "The Ancestry of Sir Thomas Cokesey" website https://archive.org/details/theancestryofsirthomascokesey/page/n9/mode/1up

1427 births
1480 deaths
John